Pharmacotherapy is therapy using pharmaceutical drugs, as distinguished from therapy using surgery (surgical therapy), radiation (radiation therapy), movement (physical therapy), or other modes. Among physicians, sometimes the term medical therapy refers specifically to pharmacotherapy as opposed to surgical or other therapy; for example, in oncology, medical oncology is thus distinguished from surgical oncology. 
Pharmacists are experts in pharmacotherapy and are responsible for ensuring the safe, appropriate, and economical use of pharmaceutical drugs. The skills required to function as a pharmacist require knowledge, training and experience in biomedical, pharmaceutical and clinical sciences.  Pharmacology is the science that aims to continually improve pharmacotherapy. The pharmaceutical industry and academia use basic science, applied science, and translational science to create new pharmaceutical drugs. 

As pharmacotherapy specialists and pharmacists have responsibility for direct patient care, often functioning as a member of a multidisciplinary team, and acting as the primary source of drug-related information for other healthcare professionals. A pharmacotherapy specialist is an individual who is specialized in administering and prescribing medication, and requires extensive academic knowledge in pharmacotherapy. 

In the US, a pharmacist can gain Board Certification in the area of pharmacotherapy upon fulfilling eligibility requirements and passing a certification examination.

While pharmacists provide valuable information about medications for patients and healthcare professionals, they are not typically considered covered pharmacotherapy providers by insurance companies.

See also 

ATC codes Anatomical Therapeutic Chemical Classification System
Chemotherapy
Classification of Pharmaco-Therapeutic Referrals CPR∫
Family medicine
General practice
Health care
 History of pharmacy
ICD-10 International Classification of Diseases
ICPC-2 PLUS
International Classification of Primary Care ICPC-2
List of pharmaceutical companies
Neuromodulation
Pharmaceutical care
Pharmaceutical drug
Pharmacist
Primary care
Referral (medicine)
Therapy

References 

Clinical pharmacology